Bertrand de Broc is a French professional sailor born on 23 September 1960 in Quimper. He has long resided in Combrit in the Finistère. He has competed in four Vendee Globe's completing the 2012-2013 Vendée Globe in 9th place.

Personal
Bertrand de Broc has a son, Leo, born in 1996, who practices windsurfing. He is also a cousin with fellow offshore sailor Marc Guillemot.

Incidents at Sea
 1992-1993 Vendée Globe: abandoned in New Zealand due to structural problem of his keel, while he is in third position. During this solo race, he had to sew his tongue.
 1996-1997 Vendée Globe: capsizing three hundred miles from the finish, in the Bay of Biscay, while he was out of the race following a stop in Ushuaia to solve technical problems.
 2002 Route du Rhum: abandonment off Brest, decision to stop solo sailing on trimaran following not feeling comfortable with two competitors capsizing.
 2012-2013 Vendée Globe: When leaving port, a collision with a boat accompanying his team causes a waterway. He is forced to turn around to repair a few minutes before departure. He left the following night and finished 9th in this race.
 2016-2017 Vendée Globe: Retires following a collision following a hull inspection.

Sailing Highlights

References

External links
 Official Website 
 Official Facebook Page
 Official Twitter Page

1960 births
Living people
French male sailors (sport)
Sportspeople from Quimper
IMOCA 60 class sailors
French Vendee Globe sailors
1992 Vendee Globe sailors
1996 Vendee Globe sailors
2012 Vendee Globe sailors
2016 Vendee Globe sailors
Vendée Globe finishers
Single-handed circumnavigating sailors